General Elliott, Eliott, or Elliot, may refer to:

Alexander Elliot (1825–1909), British Army major general
Christopher Haslett Elliott (born 1947), British Army major general
Christopher Leslie Elliott (born 1947), British Army major general
Edward Locke Elliot (1850–1938), British Army lieutenant general
Francis Augustus Eliott, 2nd Baron Heathfield (1750–1813), British Army general
Frank Worth Elliott Jr. (1924–1997), U.S. Air Force major general
George Augustus Eliott, 1st Baron Heathfield (1717–1790), British Army general
George F. Elliott (1846–1931), U.S. Marine Corps major general
Granville Elliott (1713–1759), British Army major general
Harold Edward Elliott (1878–1931), Australian Army major general
Roger Elliott (c. 1665–1714), English Army major general
Stephen Elliott Jr. (1830–1866), Confederate States Army brigadier general
Washington Lafayette Elliott (1825–1888), Union Army brigadier general
William Henry Elliott (1792–1874), British Army general

See also
Attorney General Elliott (disambiguation)